Derek Robbins (born 4 January 1952) is a Canadian former alpine skier who competed in the 1972 Winter Olympics.

References

1952 births
Living people
Canadian male alpine skiers
Olympic alpine skiers of Canada
Alpine skiers at the 1972 Winter Olympics
20th-century Canadian people